The 1982 Vuelta a España was the 37th edition of the Vuelta a España, one of cycling's Grand Tours. The Vuelta began in Santiago de Compostela, with a prologue individual time trial on 20 April, and Stage 9 occurred on 29 April with a stage to Puigcerdà. The race finished in Madrid on 9 May.

Prologue
20 April 1982 — Santiago de Compostela to Santiago de Compostela,  (ITT)

Stage 1a
21 April 1982 — Santiago de Compostela to A Coruña,

Stage 1b
21 April 1982 — A Coruña to Lugo,

Stage 2
22 April 1982 — Lugo to Gijón,

Stage 3
23 April 1982 — Gijón to Santander,

Stage 4
24 April 1982 — Santander to Reinosa,

Stage 5
25 April 1982 — Reinosa to Logroño,

Stage 6
26 April 1982 — Logroño to Zaragoza,

Stage 7
27 April 1982 — Zaragoza to Sabiñánigo,

Stage 8
28 April 1982 — Sabiñánigo to Lleida,

Stage 9
29 April 1982 — Artesa de Segre to Puigcerdà,

References

1982 Vuelta a España
Vuelta a España stages